Te Afualiku is an islet of Funafuti, Tuvalu.

Te Ava Tepuka and Te Avua Sari are two neighbouring passages through Funafuti atoll in the northeast, between the islets of Te Afualiku to the northeast and Tepuka to the southwest.

Te Ava i te Lape is the favoured entrance into the lagoon, although it has a depth of only 5.8 metres, and a width of barely 500 metres. It is in the north, between the islets of Pava to the east and Te Afualiku to the west.

References

Islands of Tuvalu
Pacific islands claimed under the Guano Islands Act
Funafuti